Louis Dominique Munnier or Meunier (17 December 1734 in Phalsbourg (Moselle ) – 1800 in Nancy, (Meurthe-et-Moselle)), was a general of the French Revolutionary Wars.  He joined the military in 1748 as an ensign, and progressed through the ranks.  Embracing the French Revolution's principles, he became a colonel in the 62nd Infantry Regiment, serving at Valmy, Hondschoote, and Mainz.

Military service
 
He entered service 21 May 1748 as an ensign in the Regiment Lowendal (Colonel and proprietor: (1) Woldemar de Lowendal, and (2) François Xavier Joseph, comte de Lowendal), and was promoted to second lieutenant on 1 October 1756 and first lieutenant 5 November 1758.  This regiment served throughout the Seven Years' War but on 18 January 1760, the first battalion, to which he was attached, merged into the Regiment Anhalt, and the second merged into the Regiment de La Marck.  On 2 March 1773 he was made a knight of Order of Saint Louis. On 28 February 1778, he became captain of grenadiers, and on 20 March he was promoted to major. During this time, also, the regiment served in the American colonies in the war against the British. He was appointed lieutenant colonel in the Regiment Salm-Salm on 2 January 1783, and 25 July 1791, he became the regimental colonel, in the renamed 62nd Infantry Regiment, replacing the  prince of Salm-Salm.  The regiment subsequently distinguished itself at Valmy. He was promoted to brigadier general on 7 September 1792, and Ernest, Baron Ruttemberg replaced him as regimental commander for a short time (until his own defection to the emigre army). On 21 October 1792, he, Anne Rene Joseph Petigny, and Adam Philippe, Comte de Custine accepted the capitulation of the city of Mainz, offered by Rudolf Eickemeyer.  While 22,000 of Custine's men remained at Mainz, Munnier commanded a column that moved on Oppenheim and Speyer.

Munnier was promoted to major general on 28 October, at the time part of the Army of the North. On 15 March 1793, his column was transferred to the Army of the Rhine, where he commanded the right wing.  That summer, his commander, Custine was arrested, tried for treason and executed; from 30 September to 2 October of that year, Munnier temporarily commanded the Army of the Rhine but on 23 October 1793, he was relieved of his command and arrested in Strasbourg; subsequently, he too was accused of treason, tried before the Revolutionary Tribunal, but acquitted. On 18 November 1794, he was released from prison and reinstated to his rank. He was admitted to retirement on 10 February 1795.

Notes and citations

Notes

Citations

1734 births
1801 deaths
French military personnel of the French Revolutionary Wars
French generals
People from Moselle (department)
Order of Saint Louis recipients